Nuevo Progreso is a municipality in the San Marcos department of Guatemala.

History 
The municipality was created on 17 October 1889 as "El Progreso'. After the murder of president general José María Reina Barrios on 8 February 1898, lawyer Manuel Estrada Cabrera reached power and from the very beginning of his tenure he set up a dictatorial rule, which would last 22 years.
 The president admirers began a program by which numerous locations and structures were named after the Presidente, and then El Progreso became "Estrada Cabrera" in 1898.

In 1908, following with the adulation program, the municipality was renamed, this time as "San Joaquin", a male version of Estrada Cabrera's mother name, Joaquina Cabrera -who had died on 3 July 1908- during the Fiestas Minervalias on 4 November 1908.  Finally, it was named "Nuevo Progreso" on 3 May 1920, by president Carlos Herrera y Luna, who issued an executive order to remove all references to Estrada Cabrera and his mother after the former president ousting on 17 April 1920.

Nuevo Progreso is also known as "El Valle Escondido" (English: "The hidden valley") of the San Marcos Department coast.

Name changes over the years

Health system

Nuevo Progreso is most well known for the "Hospital de la Familia" located there. Medical specialists from the United States visit to offer care to those in need. When the specialists are in town, people often visit from across the country because of the expert care they can receive.

Climate

Nuevo Progreso has tropical climate(Köppen:Am).

Geographic location 

It is surrounded by San Marcos Department municipalities, except on the South, where it borders Coatepeque, a Quetzaltenango municipality.

See also
 
 
 La Aurora International Airport
 Manuel Estrada Cabrera
 Tapachula International Airport

References

External links 
Hospital de la Familia

Municipalities of the San Marcos Department